The Don CeSar is a hotel located in St. Pete Beach, Florida. Developed by Thomas Rowe and opened in 1928, it gained renown as the Gulf playground for America's pampered rich at the height of the Jazz Age. The hotel was designed by Henry H. Dupont. The Don CeSar is a member of Historic Hotels of America, the official program of the National Trust for Historic Preservation.

Construction
In 1924, Thomas Rowe purchased  of land in St. Petersburg, Florida for $100,000 to begin his dream of building a "pink castle". He hired architect Henry Dupont to design the hotel and Carlton Beard as contractor. To ensure the stability of the hotel on the shifting sand and avoid the high cost of sinking so many pilings, Beard devised a floating concrete pad and pyramid footings. To this day, there is no sign of evident settling of the hotel. The architecture is a blend of Mediterranean and Moorish styles modeled after different hotels and developments that Rowe and Beard saw in Palm Beach, Coral Gables and Boca Raton. Arched openings, red clay tile roofs, balconies, stucco over hollow tile and tower like upper stories were some of the elements that they borrowed. The original design called for a $450,000 six-story hotel with 110 rooms and baths. It was expanded to 220 rooms and 220 baths, and the costs soared to $1.25 million, 300% over budget. Rowe named it Don Ce-Sar after Don César de Bazan, the hero of William Vincent Wallace's opera Maritana.

Opening
Rowe's "Pink Lady" opened on January 16, 1928, with an extravagant party attended by the elite of Tampa, Florida and St. Petersburg, Florida. The hotel quickly became a favorite romping ground for the rich and famous of the Jazz Age including F. Scott Fitzgerald, Clarence Darrow, Al Capone, Lou Gehrig, and Franklin D. Roosevelt. The Pink Palace continued to attract the rich and famous throughout the Great Depression in part to a deal made with New York Yankees owner Jacob Ruppert to house his team during spring training for three years.

However, after the sudden death of Rowe without a will, The Don was left to his estranged wife and began to fall into disrepair until the United States entered into World War II, and the hotel was bought by the Army for $450,000. It was converted into a military hospital and reopened in December 1942. In February 1944, the Don Ce-Sar became a convalescent center for the United States Army Air Corps. In June 1945, the Don Ce-Sar was ordered closed and was vacant by September 1945. It was converted into a Veterans Administration Regional Office by the end of 1945.

Rebirth
In November 1967, the Veterans Administration began moving out of the Don Ce-Sar, having opened a new office in downtown St. Petersburg. By Spring 1969, the once grand hotel was vacant. The General Services Administration planned to raze the graffiti-covered hotel, but this plan was met with fierce opposition from local residents. In March 1972, the Don Ce-Sar was sold to C.L. Pyatt and William Bowman Jr., a franchise owner of Holiday Inn. The Don CeSar (now spelled without the hyphen) reopened on November 23, 1973. Multiple renovations from 1985 to 2001 have updated and added to the hotel, including a  spa, a signature restaurant, and a second outdoor swimming pool. After the addition of the full-service beach club and spa, the official name of the hotel was changed to The Don CeSar Beach Resort and Spa.

The Don CeSar was named to the National Register of Historic Places in 1975 and became a founding member of the National Trust Historic Hotels of America in 1989.

In popular culture
 The Don CeSar was featured in a full-color two-page spread in a 1982 issue of National Geographic.
 Don CeSar Hotel in St. Pete Beach, Fla, is said to be haunted by the unchained ghost of its original owner, Thomas Rowe {see " Don CeSar Hotel in St. Petersburg Beach" under 'Florida' in the Wikipedia article "Haunted Locations"}
 Two-hour long ghost tours of the hauntings at the Don CeSar are offered by a local sightseeing company.
 Parts of Once Upon a Time in America were filmed at the Don CeSar.
 Comedian Ron White talked about his stay at the Don CeSar in the movie Blue Collar Comedy Tour: One for the Road.
 Tom Petty and The Heartbreakers filmed a music video at the Don CeSar in 1985.
 Robert Altman's film Health was filmed in the hotel.
 The Don CeSar has a long list of famous guests and has hosted Franklin D. Roosevelt and every president since Gerald Ford (excluding Ronald Reagan).
 Thunder in Paradise was filmed around the Don CeSar during April 1993.
 The 1999 film Forever Mine was filmed at the Don CeSar.
 The Don CeSar was one of the featured hotels in the episode "Big Night Out" of Emeril's Florida, a 2013 series starring Emeril Lagasse.
 The 2016 Brad Furman movie The Infiltrator was filmed in part on the rooftop balcony of the Don CeSar in Spring 2015.
 The Pitbull song "Sexy Beaches" was used in the "Visit Florida" tourism campaign, sponsored by the state of Florida. The music video was filmed at The Don CeSar in St. Petersburg, Florida, and was uploaded to Pitbull's YouTube on July 13, 2016.
 The TV series Life's Rewards was filmed in St. Petersburg and Clearwater, Florida, and its setting is the Don CeSar.

See also
 List of Historic Hotels of America

References

External links

Florida's Office of Cultural and Historical Programs
Pinellas County listings
Don Ce Sar Resort and Spa

Hotels in Florida
National Register of Historic Places in Pinellas County, Florida
Moorish Revival architecture in Florida
Mediterranean Revival architecture in Florida
Buildings and structures in St. Petersburg, Florida
Tourist attractions in St. Petersburg, Florida
Historic American Buildings Survey in Florida
1928 establishments in Florida
Hotels established in 1928
Hotel buildings completed in 1928
Hotel buildings on the National Register of Historic Places in Florida
Historic Hotels of America